Central London Property Trust Ltd v High Trees House Ltd [1947] KB 130 is a famous English contract law decision in the High Court. It reaffirmed and extended the doctrine of promissory estoppel in contract law in England and Wales. However, the most significant part of the judgment is obiter dicta as it relates to hypothetical facts; that is, the landlord did not seek repayment of the full wartime rent.

Denning J held estoppel to be applicable if

Facts
High Trees House Ltd leased a block of flats in Clapham, London from Central London Property Trust Ltd. The agreement was made in 1937 and specified an annual ground rent of £2,500. The outbreak of World War II in September 1939 led to a downturn in the rental market. High Trees struggled to find tenants for the property and approached Central London Property Trust in January 1940 to request that the rent be lowered. A reduction to £1,250 per year was agreed in writing, though the duration was not specified and no consideration was provided.

By 1945, the building was returning to full occupancy. On 21 September 1945, Central London Property wrote to High Trees to request a return to the full rent of £2,500 and claiming arrears of £7,916 for the period since 1940. They then brought a test action to recover part of the debt for the two quarters which had elapsed since June 1945.

Judgment
Based on previous judgments as Hughes v Metropolitan Railway Co, Denning J held that the full rent was payable from the time that the flats became fully occupied in mid-1945. However, he continued in an obiter statement that if Central London had tried to claim for the full rent from 1940 onwards, they would not have been able to. This was reasoned on the basis that if a party leads another party to believe that he will not enforce his strict legal rights, then the courts will prevent him from doing so at a later stage. Being obiter dicta and in a court of first instance this was doubly not a binding precedent, yet it essentially created the doctrine of promissory estoppel.

Significance
Advances have been made in promissory estoppel since its inception in High Trees to create a new inroad into the rule in Pinnel's case that an agreement to accept part payment of a debt in full satisfaction of it is unenforceable for want of consideration. Denning commented that such an agreement should now be enforceable under the doctrine of promissory estoppel, and indeed the plaintiff did not seek the full debt on the basis of what was fair and, perhaps, thought was the law. However, the courts were at first reluctant to overrule or distinguish cases like Pinnel's case and Foakes v Beer having formed part of the common law for so long. Lady Justice Arden in Collier v P & MJ Wright (Holdings) Ltd (2007) accepted in principle that High Trees could be used to extinguish a creditor's right to full payment of a debt in such circumstances.

In Amalgamated Investment Co v Texas Bank it was decided that proprietary estoppel can act as a sword and not merely as a shield (that is, it can be used as a cause of action rather than merely providing a defence to an action).

See also
 Estoppel
 Promise

References

Lord Denning cases
English enforceability case law
English estoppel case law
1946 in British law
High Court of Justice cases
1946 in case law